The MG 14/40 or MG 14/40 Mark IV is a sports car that was made by MG and launched in 1927. It was based on the contemporary Morris Oxford flatnose and was a development of the MG 14/28 and was built at Edmund Road, Cowley, Oxford where MG had moved in September 1927. During production it became the first model to carry an MG Octagon badge on its radiator, the previous cars had retained a Morris Oxford badge.

The change of name from 14/28 to 14/40 seems mainly to have been a marketing exercise and the reason for the Mark IV is unclear although it has been suggested that it represented the fourth year of production.  Externally the cars are very difficult to tell apart.

There were some changes to the 14/28 chassis and suspension and the brake servo was deleted. Production ended in 1929, after approximately 700 cars had been built.

References

External links 

14 40
Cars introduced in 1927